= Speed limits in Malta =

The general speed limits in Malta are as follows:

General Speed limits
Type of road	Urban	Rural
Cars and motorcycles	50 km/h (31 mph)	80 km/h (50 mph)
Vans	40 km/h (25 mph)	60 km/h (37 mph)
Cars and vans with trailers	40 km/h (25 mph)	60 km/h (37 mph)
Heavy goods vehicles (over 3.5 t)	40 km/h (25 mph)	60 km/h (37 mph)
Buses	40 km/h (25 mph)	60 km/h (37 mph)
